Asano Munetsune (September 27, 1717 – January 2, 1788) was a Japanese daimyō of  period, who ruled the Hiroshima Domain. His childhood name was Senjirō (仙次郎) later Iwamatsu (岩松).

Family
 Father: Asano Yoshinaga (Lord of Hiroshima)
 Mother: Maeda Ushihime, daughter of Maeda Tsunanori, 4th Daimyo of Kaga Domain
 Wife: Maeda Kiyohime, daughter of Maeda Yoshinori, 5th Daimyo of Kaga Domain
 Concubine: Izumi no Kata
 Children:
Asano Shigeakira by Izumi no Kata
 Mizuno Tadakane (1744–1818) of Karatsu Domain
 Asano Nagakazu (1745–1808)
 Asano Nagatsumi
 daughter married Matsudaira Sadakatsu of Iyo-Matsuyama Domain later married Matsudaira Suketsugu of Miyazu Domain

References

1717 births
1788 deaths
Daimyo
Asano clan